The 1946 Cork Senior Football Championship was the 58th staging of the Cork Senior Football Championship since its establishment by the Cork County Board in 1887. 

On 24 November 1946, Clonakilty won the championship following a 1-02 to 0-03 defeat of Fermoy, the defending champions, in the final. This was their fifth championship title overall and their first title since 1944.

Results

Final

Championship statistics

Miscellaneous
 Clonakilty win the title for the fourth time in five seasons.
 For the fifth season in a row Fermoy face Clonakilty in the final.

References

Cork Senior Football Championship